Frances Claudia Wright, OBE (5 March 1919 – 2 April 2010), was a prominent Sierra Leonean lawyer during the 20th century. Known as "West Africa's Portia", in 1941 Wright was the first Sierra Leonean woman to be called to the Bar in Great Britain and to practise law in Sierra Leone.

Early life
Frances Claudia Wright was born in Freetown, British Sierra Leone, to Sierra Leone Creole parents, Claude and Eva Wright. Her father Claude and his brother Ernest Jenner were born in England to Sophie Slocombe, an English woman, and the Sierra Leone Creole man Claudius Ernest Wright, then a student.  He later became a lawyer who served on the Legislative Council of Sierra Leone and as mayor of Freetown. Like his father, Claude studied law.  He was called to the Bar at the age of 21, at the top of his class. He went to Sierra Leone from England in search of his father, finding that he had died and left Claude's half siblings in debt. Deciding to settle in the Creole society of Freetown, Wright set up a practice and revived his father's Gloucester Street premises, and also served on the Legislative Council.

Frances's mother was Eva Smith, who was the outside daughter of Francis Smith, the second Sierra Leonean to qualify as a lawyer. Francis Smith was the brother of Claudius Wright's mother-in-law and was the half-brother of Adelaide Casely-Hayford. Smith had served as puisne judge on the Gold Coast after attending QEGS in Wakefield, England.

To satisfy her father's aspirations for a child to succeed him as lawyer, Frances Wright studied at Bedford Girls' Modern School (now Dame Alice Harpur School), in England and was called to the Bar from Gray's Inn on 17 November 1941, during the Second World War. In 1943, she sailed for Sierra Leone on the ship SS California, but when this was sunk off North Africa she lost all of her possessions and had to be rescued by HMCS Iroquois.

Career
Wright made her way to Sierra Leone and joined her father's practice. She proved a force in the judiciary of Sierra Leone, once confronting Andrew Juxon-Smith with the expectation that she would be arrested. She served as the President of the Bar Association.

Wright never married. In 1991 she left the country at the outbreak of the Sierra Leone Civil War and settled in South Kensington in England. Her father's practice in Freetown was destroyed in the war.

Frances Wright died in England on 2 April 2010.

Legacy and honours
Wright was awarded an OBE by the Queen of the United Kingdom for legal services.

See also 
 First women lawyers around the world

Notes 

1919 births
2010 deaths
Members of Gray's Inn
Officers of the Order of the British Empire
Sierra Leone Creole people
Sierra Leonean people of British descent
Sierra Leonean people of Scottish descent
20th-century Sierra Leonean lawyers
People educated at Dame Alice Harpur School
Sierra Leonean expatriates in the United Kingdom
20th-century women lawyers